Fred Stolle and Lesley Turner were the defending champions, but lost in the semifinals to Neale Fraser and Margaret duPont.

Fraser and duPont defeated Dennis Ralston and Ann Haydon in the final, 11–9, 6–2 to win the mixed doubles tennis title at the 1962 Wimbledon Championships.

Seeds

  Fred Stolle /  Lesley Turner (semifinals)
  Bob Howe /  Maria Bueno (semifinals)
  Neale Fraser /  Margaret duPont (champions)
  Jiří Javorský /  Věra Suková (quarterfinals)

Draw

Finals

Top half

Section 1

Section 2

Section 3

Section 4

Bottom half

Section 5

Section 6

Section 7

Section 8

References

External links

X=Mixed Doubles
Wimbledon Championship by year – Mixed doubles